"Falling" is the debut single by English pop group Boom!, released in late 2000. The song was a hit, peaking at No. 11 on the UK Singles Chart in January 2001.

Can't Stop the Pop described the song as "an incredibly clean-sounding track; it's slick and light on its feet, which is perfectly in-line with the sort of material being peddled by Artful Dodger, but perhaps a little throwaway by pop – and debut single – standards." They then went on to say: "Perhaps more than was evident at the time, since their brand of garage-pop was not a million miles from that of Liberty X, who would launch later that year. Perhaps, however, in early-2001, there just wasn't enough to convince London Records that garage wasn't a passing fad. Nonetheless, 'Falling' is a quality track and – even if we didn't know it at the time – an incredibly accurate indication of things to come."

Track listing
UK CD single CD 1
 "Falling" - 3:22
 "Boy Versus Girl" - 3:17
 "Boy Versus Girl (Darude vs. JS16 Remix) - 8:09

UK CD single CD 2
 "Falling" - 3:20
 "Flipside" - 3:08
 "Falling" (Paul "Sweet P" Watson Remix) - 6:25
 Music Video

References

2000 songs
2000 debut singles
UK garage songs
English pop songs
Songs written by Lucas Secon
London Records singles